is a Japanese pop duo signed to Sony Music Japan consisting of two female members, vocalist/pianist  and vocalist/guitarist . Rythem was active from 2003 until 2011; in 2021, they announced their return to performing on their official YouTube channel.

History 
In May 2003, while both performers were still high school seniors, Rythem's first single, "Harmonia", was released and was used as the second ending theme song for Naruto.  Four more singles, including the theme song for With the Light and their debut album Utatane, was released before "Hōki Gumo" was released in early 2005 as a single for the first opening theme of Yakitate!! Japan.

The eighth single, "20 Tsubu no Kokoro", was a collection of songs dedicated by Yui and Yuka to each other. The ninth single, "Kokoro Bīdama" was used as the sixth and final ending theme song of Yakitate!! Japan. The tenth single will be titled "Negai" and will be used as the ending theme of The Nippon TV show Sukkiri (スッキリ). Rythem's second album (along with an accompanying DVD) was released in May and June 2006; it compiles their post-UTATANE works and includes full-length versions of short pieces originally performed on their weekly radio show, Enjoy Your Time!.

In late 2006, Rythem performed a series of live concerts entitled "Acoustic PoP", before releasing another single, Sakura Uta (or 'song of the cherry blossoms'), in early 2007. As well as being a tie-in for the anime series Deltora Quest (first ending theme), the single also marks the beginning of the "Third Stage" or Rythem's venture into the music arena.

Their twelfth single, Hotarubi or 'firefly', originally scheduled for release in August 2006, was postponed and released on July 18, 2007. Their album 23 was released on October 1, 2008.

Both members have written songs for other artists. Yuka wrote two songs, "Moment" and "I my me", for Yui Horie, and wrote the lyrics for all the songs of Rie Tanaka's album, Kokoro, released October 20, 2010. Yui contributed a composition ("Frame") for the same album of Tanaka's, wrote "Milk" for Rina Sakamoto, and recorded a duet ("Laundry") with Rie fu for the album, at Rie sessions.

Breakup
Rythem announced on October 24, 2010 on a live streaming video that all activities of Rythem would end on February 27, 2011, following the group's "Final Fantasy Live: The Best Rhythm in Rythem's History" performance. Their last single, "A Flower", was released on November 10, 2010; their final album, Rythem, was released on December 8, 2010.

A complete box set of 5 Blu-spec CDs and 5 DVDs, "RYTHEM COMPLETE BOX～Music of the people, by the people, for the people", was scheduled for release on May 25, 2011. It has a full collection of all their songs (a total of 72), including a new one called "Ai no Kotoba" (Words of Love). The DVDs contain all their music videos, footage of their final live performance, and documentaries of their seven years of publicity and interviews. Along with the ten discs, the box ships with a booklet and a pair of character figurines of the duo (designed by Yui herself).
 
In the official announcement on their homepage, Yui and Yuka stated that they will use their full names to perform music in the future. Yui and Yuka have already begun work as solo artists, with Yui changing her stage name to "Neat's". Yuka mentioned in an update to subscribers of her mailing list on March 11, 2011 that she has been recording demos, and it was announced that Yui will perform in a charity event, "＆SACHI vol.HOPE", on May 24, 2011 as a guest.

Comeback
In early 2021, Rythem launched new official YouTube, Twitter, and Instagram accounts. They began uploading photos of the band's history in anticipation for a livestream to be held the 21st of May. In the livestream, they announced the duo would be resuming activities. They also re-launched their website and fan community, now called . Both performers still intend to continue their respective solo careers.

Discography

Studio album
 Utatane
 Mugen Factory
 23
 Rythem

Compilation album
 Best Story
"RYTHEM COMPLETE BOX～Music of the people, by the people, for the people"

Singles
Harmonia - Released: May 21, 2003
Tenkyu (New Summer Version) - Released: August 6, 2003
Blue Sky Blue - Released: November 9, 2003
Hitoritabi Shararuran - Released: April 21, 2004
Mangekyō Kirakira - Released: May 26, 2004
Houki Gumo - Released: January 26, 2005
Mikazuki Rhapsody - Released: August 24, 2005
20 Tsubu no Kokoro - Released: January 1, 2006
Kokoro Bīdama - Released: March 1, 2006
Negai - Released: April 26, 2006
Sakura Uta - Released: February 28, 2007
Hotarubi - Released: July 18, 2007
WINNER - Released: October 10, 2007
Bitter & Sweet - Released: November 17, 2007
Kubisuji Line - Released: February 10, 2008
Love Call/Akari no Arika - Released: July 23, 2008
Gyuttoshite - Released: July 29, 2009
Tsunaide te - Released: November 11, 2009
Mudai - Released: July 7, 2010
A Flower - Released: November 10, 2010

References

External links
Rythem's official YouTube channel 

Japanese pop music groups
Japanese women singer-songwriters
Japanese singer-songwriters
Sony Music Entertainment Japan artists
Japanese musical duos
Musical groups established in 2003
Musical groups disestablished in 2011
Musical groups reestablished in 2021
Musical groups from Kanagawa Prefecture
2003 establishments in Japan
2011 disestablishments in Japan